{{Infobox clergy
| name = Hannibal Richard Cabral Honey Cabral
| image =
| imagesize =
| caption =
| pseudonym =
| birthname =
| birth_date = 1955
| birth_place = Mangalore
| death_date = 23rd October, 2021
| death_place = Mangalore
| occupation = theologian, Christian Educator, communication specialist, dramatist
| nationality = Indian
| ordained    =1976 as Deacon; 1980 as Presbyter Church of South India
| writings    = 2001, The Role of Music in Religious Communication: Implications for a Theological Curriculum
2006, Missionaries and Carnatic Music<ref name="Reinhard">Hannibal R. Cabral, Missionaries and Carnatic Music in Reinhard Wendt (Edited), An Indian to the Indians?: On the Initial Failure and the Posthumous Success of the Missionary Ferdinand Kittel (1832-1903), Otto Harrossowitz Verlag, Wiesbaden, 2006, pp.255-264.  </ref>
| congregations =Pastor, Church of South India 
| offices_held =Teacher, Karnataka Theological College, Mangalore
| title       = The Reverend Doctor
| footnotes   = 
}}

Hannibal Richard Cabral (1955 — 23rd October 2021) was the former principal of Karnataka Theological College, Mangalore, a seminary established in 1965 and affiliated to India's first University, the Senate of Serampore College. Cabral was appointed by the College Council as Principal in 2009 as John Sadananda, then principal, was elevated to the Bishopric of the Karnataka Southern Diocese of the Church of South India.

Studies
Cabral had his spiritual formation at the Karnataka Theological College, Mangalore, when he enrolled for a graduate course in 1971, receiving a Bachelor of Theology degree and later was upgraded to a Bachelor of Divinity degree at the Karnataka Theological College during the principalship of C. D. Jathanna. Cabral later underwent postgraduate studies at United Theological College, Bangalore during the years 1988-1990 and worked out a dissertation entitled An evaluation of the effectiveness of selected Christian dramas in Kannada in communication of the Gospel during the Principalship of Gnana Robinson leading to the award of Master of Theology.

Cabral also studied at the Princeton Theological Seminary for a year in 1993.

Continuing his studies, Cabral enrolled for doctoral studies at the South Asia Theological Research Institute, Bangalore and on successful submission of his dissertation, he was awarded aDoctor of Theology degree by the Senate of Serampore College in 1998.

Cabral pursued all his theological degrees from the University, with the exception of a postgraduation course from Princeton, and was awarded degrees in successive Convocations by the Senate of Serampore College (University), all during the Registrarships of J. T. Krogh and D. S. Satyaranjan.

Initiatives
In 2010, Karnataka Theological College, under the Principalship of Cabral, announced the start of a two-year postgraduate programme leading to the award of Master of Arts in association with the George August University of Göttingen.

Writings
 In 2001, The Role of Music in Religious Communication: Implications for a Theological Curriculum,
 In 2006, Missionaries and Carnatic MusicChristian Hymns in vernacular languages were composed and sung to Indian classical music by the early Missionaries and the early Christians in India.  P. Solomon Raj in the context of the Christian Hymnal in Telugu writes that it has been of high literary standard consisting of hymns in Telugu set in music patterns of Carnatic music and Hindustani classical music.  Similarly, in 2000, Roger E. Hedlund, the Missiologist wrote that, along with the Bible, the Christian Hymnal in Telugu also formed the main bulwark of Christian spiritual life for the Telugu folk and of equal use to both the non-literates and the literates as well.  It is in such a context that Cabral in his article Missionaries and Carnatic Music'' writes that the early Missionaries with special reference to Ferdinand Kittel were bemused by the Hindustani classical music and began composing songs in the local tradition.

Lyricist
Michael Traber, formerly Professor of Communication at the United Theological College, writes that Cabral had composed more than 500 songs in Kannada, English, Tulu and Hindi and had a stint at radio with the State-run All India Radio and the Far East Broadcasting Associates.

References 

1955 births
Living people
Christian clergy from Karnataka
Kannada people
20th-century Christian clergy
Indian Anglican priests
Indian Christian theologians
Senate of Serampore College (University) alumni
Princeton Theological Seminary alumni
Academic staff of the Senate of Serampore College (University)